Herophydrus is a genus of beetles in the family Dytiscidae, containing the following species:

 Herophydrus assimilis Régimbart, 1895
 Herophydrus bilardoi Biström & Nilsson, 2002
 Herophydrus capensis Régimbart, 1895
 Herophydrus cleopatrae (Peyron, 1858)
 Herophydrus confusus Régimbart, 1895
 Herophydrus discrepatus Guignot, 1954
 Herophydrus endroedyi Biström & Nilsson, 2002
 Herophydrus gigantoides Biström & Nilsson, 2002
 Herophydrus gigas Régimbart, 1895
 Herophydrus gschwendtneri Omer-Cooper, 1957
 Herophydrus guineensis (Aubé, 1838)
 Herophydrus heros Sharp, 1882
 Herophydrus hyphoporoides Régimbart, 1895
 Herophydrus ignoratus Gschwendtner, 1933
 Herophydrus inquinatus (Boheman, 1848)
 Herophydrus janssensi Guignot, 1952
 Herophydrus kalaharii Gschwendtner, 1935
 Herophydrus morandi Guignot, 1952
 Herophydrus musicus (Klug, 1834)
 Herophydrus muticus (Sharp, 1882)
 Herophydrus natator Biström & Nilsson, 2002
 Herophydrus nigrescens Biström & Nilsson, 2002
 Herophydrus nodieri (Régimbart, 1895)
 Herophydrus obscurus Sharp, 1882
 Herophydrus obsoletus Régimbart, 1895
 Herophydrus ovalis Gschwendtner, 1932
 Herophydrus pallidus Omer-Cooper, 1931
 Herophydrus pauliani Guignot, 1950
 Herophydrus quadrilineatus Régimbart, 1895
 Herophydrus ritsemae Régimbart, 1889
 Herophydrus rohani Peschet, 1924
 Herophydrus rufus (Clark, 1863)
 Herophydrus sjostedti Régimbart, 1908
 Herophydrus spadiceus Sharp, 1882
 Herophydrus sudanensis Guignot, 1952
 Herophydrus tribolus Guignot, 1953
 Herophydrus variabilis Régimbart, 1906
 Herophydrus vaziranii (Nilsson, 1999)
 Herophydrus verticalis Sharp, 1882
 Herophydrus vittatus Régimbart, 1895
 Herophydrus wewalkai Biström & Nilsson, 2002

References

Dytiscidae